The external vertebral venous plexuses (extraspinal veins) best marked in the cervical region, consist of anterior and posterior plexuses which anastomose freely with each other.
 The anterior external plexuses lie in front of the bodies of the vertebræ, communicate with the basivertebral and intervertebral veins, and receive tributaries from the vertebral bodies.
 The posterior external plexuses are placed partly on the posterior surfaces of the vertebral arches and their processes, and partly between the deep dorsal muscles.

They are best developed in the cervical region, and there anastomose with the vertebral, occipital, and deep cervical veins.

References

External links
  - "Venous Drainage of the Vertebral Column"

Veins of the torso